Simply Read Books is a children's specific publishing house situated in Vancouver, BC, Canada.

Awards (incomplete list)
Books published by Simply Read Books have won the following awards:

Governor General's Literary Award for Children's Literature, Illustration
Marilyn Baillie Picture Book Award
Awards for Excellence in Book Design in Canada by the Alcuin Society

Authors and illustrators (incomplete list)

Duncan Weller
Kari-Lynn Winters
Shaun Tan
John Marsden (writer)
Iassen Ghiuselev
Elisa Gutiérrez
Matthew Porter
Sara O'Leary
Julie Morstad 
Thomas Aquinas Maguire
Ryan Heshka
Dan Bar-el
Tamara James
Christine Dencer
Ashley Spires

Controversy
 Simply Read Books has had complaints of late payments, breaches of contracts, and other allegations by many of its authors. This publisher had been the subject of negative articles in Publishers Weekly, the CBC (Canadian Broadcasting Company), and the Quill and Quire.

References

External links
 Simply Read Books webpage

Book publishing companies of Canada